Lyrognathus is a genus of Asian tarantulas that was first described by Reginald Innes Pocock in 1895.

Species
 it contains seven species, all found in Asia:
Lyrognathus achilles West & Nunn, 2010 – Borneo
Lyrognathus crotalus Pocock, 1895 (type) – India
Lyrognathus fuscus West & Nunn, 2010 – Borneo
Lyrognathus giannisposatoi Nunn & West, 2013 – Indonesia (Sumatra)
Lyrognathus lessunda West & Nunn, 2010 – Indonesia (Lombok)
Lyrognathus robustus Smith, 1988 – Malaysia
Lyrognathus saltator Pocock, 1900 – India

In synonymy:
L. liewi West, 1991 = Lyrognathus robustus Smith, 1988
L. pugnax Pocock, 1900 = Lyrognathus crotalus Pocock, 1895

See also
 List of Theraphosidae species

References

Theraphosidae genera
Spiders of Asia
Taxa named by R. I. Pocock
Theraphosidae